Peadar Tóibín (born 19 June 1974) is an Irish politician who has served as Leader of Aontú since January 2019. He has been a Teachta Dála (TD) for the Meath West constituency since 2011. He previously served as Chair of the Committee on Arts, Heritage, Regional, Rural and Gaeltacht Affairs from 2016 to 2018. He founded Aontú in January 2019.

He was elected as a Sinn Féin candidate in 2011, but resigned from the party on 15 November 2018.

Political career
While studying in University College Dublin, Tóibín was a member of Fianna Fáil and an active member of the UCD branch, the Kevin Barry Cumann. He joined Sinn Féin in 1998.

Sinn Féin (2004–2018)

At the 2004 local elections, he stood unsuccessfully for Navan Town Council, and for the Navan local electoral area of Meath County Council. He was co-opted onto Navan Town Council in November 2007, and held that seat at the 2009 local elections, when he was again unsuccessful in the county council election.

Tóibín was suspended from the Sinn Féin parliamentary party for six months in July 2013, when he defied the party whip by voting against the Protection of Life During Pregnancy Bill 2013.

He called for a 'No' vote in the 2018 Referendum on the Eighth Amendment. He and his party colleague Carol Nolan, who had been suspended from Sinn Féin for voting against policy on the abortion issue, were the only representatives from the party to attend a photocall in Merrion Square in Dublin to publicise the 'No' campaign.

Tóibín was again suspended from the Sinn Féin parliamentary party for six months in October 2018, when he defied the party whip by voting against the Regulation of Termination of Pregnancy Bill 2018.

On 15 November 2018, Tóibín announced his resignation from Sinn Féin, saying that restrictions imposed on him by the party over his views on abortion had "prevented me from fully representing my constituents".

Aontú (2019–present)
After resigning from Sinn Féin in November 2018, Tóibín announced that he would attempt to establish an alternative political party. On 28 January 2019, he announced that the name of his new political party would be Aontú, Irish for "unity and consent".

At the 2020 general election, Tóibín retained his seat in Meath West with 7,322 first-preference votes, or 17.6%, taking the second of the constituency's three seats.

In February 2022, Tóibín used parliamentary privilege to name Soldier F, a soldier accused of murdering two people on Bloody Sunday. This was the first time the soldier had been identified in the Dáil. He had previously been identified by name in the British parliament, and in Village magazine in Ireland.

Personal life
He is a business consultant. He is married to Deirdre Tóibín, they have four children. He was the Chairperson of the Save Navan Hospital Campaign. He has a degree in Economics and Politics from University College Dublin (UCD).

References

External links

1974 births
Alumni of University College Dublin
Aontú politicians
Fianna Fáil politicians
Independent TDs
Irish anti-abortion activists
Leaders of political parties in Northern Ireland
Living people
Local councillors in County Meath
Members of the 31st Dáil
Members of the 32nd Dáil
Members of the 33rd Dáil
People from Drogheda
Sinn Féin TDs (post-1923)